David of Kakheti was a Choreposcopus (or prince) of Kakheti, a principality of Eastern Georgia, who ruled from 976 until his death 1010.

A member of the Kyriacid dynasty that governed over Kakheti since the end of the 9th century, he reigned for 34 years at a time when Bagrationi prince Bagrat III was attempting to unify Georgian lands. In this context, he faced two Georgian invasions in 1008 and 1010. Defeated once, he was reestablished to his throne by a noble revolt, but only ruled for a short time before his death.

Biography 
David was the youngest son of Kvirike II, Chorepiscopus of Kakheti. His older brother Phadla died before 957, making him the heir to the throne of this Georgian Orthodox principality, at a time when the latter was in the midst of conflict with the neighboring Kingdom of Abkhazia. When King Leon III of Abkhazia, who controlled Georgian lands from the Black Sea to the border of Kakheti, acceded his throne in 957, he agreed to peace with between the two states and gave his daughter to wed David.

The young princess gave birth to three children but died soon and that death led to a new war between Abkhazia and Kakheti. David would not remarry.

After his father's death in 976, David took over and became Chorepiscopus of Kakheti, a title with religious connotations but secularized over time to mean "hereditary prince". According to medieval chronicler Leontius of Ruisi, he reigned "wisely" for 34 years from the Dzveli Galavani ("Old Walls") Fortress in Telavi, maintaining an unstable peace with Abkhazia and sharing the region of Kartli with it.

In 1008, the ambitious Bagrat III, King of Abkhazia and ruler of Tao-Klarjeti, became King of Kartvelians, thus unifying the three most important titles of Georgia. Launching a campaign to unify Georgia, he sought to push David out of Kartli, threatening him with war unless he handed over his fortresses in central Georgia. David sent him a letter stating: 

Bagrat III, at the helm of a powerful army of Abkhazians and Kartlians, crossed the bridge of Mtskheta and invaded Tianeti, at the north of Kakheti. David's forces were rapidly defeated, as he was forced to find refuge in Hereti, the easternmost province of Kakheti, while Bagrat III annexed the rest of his principality and appointing bureaucrat Abulal as local governor. The Georgian king continued his expedition towards Hereti and managed to submit the region.

The local nobility, in fear of the autocratic and centralized regime of Bagrat III, remained loyal to David and rebelled between 1009 and 1010, restoring David on the throne. However, the latter only governed Hereti, before dying in 1010. He left on his weakened throne his son Kvirike III, who continued his father's war before winning independence in 1014.

Family 
Prince David married around 957 a daughter of King Leon III of Abkhazia, who gave him three children:
 Kvirike, later King of Kakheti
 Zolakertel, wife of King David I Anhoghin
 a daughter, married to a prince of Marisili.

Bibliography

References 

1010 deaths
Year of birth unknown